Hemirhabdorhynchus is an extinct genus of prehistoric Actinopterygii, or ray-finned fish, that lived from the early to middle Eocene.

See also

 Prehistoric fish
 List of prehistoric bony fish

References

Eocene fish
Prehistoric perciform genera
Eocene fish of North America